Badhaiyatal is a rural municipality located in Bardiya District of Lumbini Province of Nepal.

The rural municipality came into existence on 10 March 2017 when the government of Nepal decided to dissolve the old administrative structure and reconstruct a new administrative division.

Jamuni, Sorhawa, Manpur Mainapokhar and Kalika VDCs were merged to form this new rural municipality. The rural municipality divided into 9 wards and Mainapokhar declared headquarter of the rural municipality. Total population of the municipality is 47868 individuals according to the 2011 Nepal census. Total area of the council is calculated .

Demographics
At the time of the 2011 Nepal census, Badhaiyatal Rural Municipality had a population of 47,948. Of these, 49.8% spoke Nepali, 36.6% Tharu, 7.4% Awadhi, 2.4% Urdu, 1.3% Magar, 0.5% Gurung, 0.5% Newar, 0.5% Hindi, 0.4% Maithili and 0.5% other languages as their first language.

In terms of ethnicity/caste, 37.3% were Tharu, 12.3% Hill Brahmin, 12.2% Chhetri, 11.4% Kami, 5.3% Magar, 2.8% Musalman, 2.7% Damai/Dholi, 2.6% Thakuri, 2.0% Yadav and 11.4% others.

In terms of religion, 92.7% were Hindu, 2.8% Muslim, 2.6% Christian, 1.7% Buddhist and 0.2% others.

See also
Bardiya District
Lumbini Province

References

Rural municipalities of Nepal established in 2017
Rural municipalities in Bardiya District